Melanella clavula is a species of sea snail, a marine gastropod mollusk in the family Eulimidae. The species is one of many species known to exist within the genus, Melanella. the shell size is 3.5 mm

References

External links
 To World Register of Marine Species

clavula
Gastropods described in 1861